State of Our Union is the second studio album by American band the Long Ryders, released in September 1985 by Island Records. It was a success at college and alternative radio stations in the US and reached number 66 on the UK Albums Chart as well as number 2 on the UK Country Chart. The single "Looking for Lewis and Clark" peaked at number 59 on the UK Singles Chart but was never released commercially in the US.

Record Collector'''s Jon Harrington described State of Our Union as an album that "combined the country rock of the Flying Burrito Brothers, the jangle of the Byrds and Chuck Berry's rock'n'roll licks with the energy and snarl of the Clash."

Background

After the success of their debut album Native Sons, released by Los Angeles-based independent record label Frontier Records in 1984, the Long Ryders signed a major label deal with Island Records in early summer 1985. During a European tour in the spring, the band had been approached by several A&R executives trying to convince them to sign with their label. Island Records UK won out, and after the tour, the band returned home to the US to write songs, record demos and look for a producer.

They chose British producer Will Birch, after a few other candidates were eliminated, including Nick Lowe and Dave Edmunds. Birch had been the drummer of power pop band the Records, a band the Long Ryders all admired. Most of the songs had been written and demoed by July, and the recording sessions for the album commenced in late summer at Chipping Norton Recording Studios in Oxfordshire, England. "Capturing the Flag", co-written by the band and their producer, was written during final rehearsals for the sessions, when Birch suggested to write one more strong song for the album. "Christmas in New Zealand" was recorded during the album sessions and released as a 7" flexi disc under the pseudonym the Spinning Wig Hats. It was given away at a few selected gigs.

"This album has country elements, but not as pronounced as on Native Sons", said guitarist Sid Griffin in 1985. He described a song like "Looking for Lewis and Clark" as "a chord being beaten into submission" – something that he didn't get from likes of Merle Haggard or the Byrds, he said. He would get it from punk bands like the Ramones, the Clash and Circle Jerks, and the Stooges' Funhouse album. "That's our bag, as it were. That weirdness and energy played on country and western instruments."

 Reception 

Although State of Our Union was popular at college and alternative radio stations in the US and entered both the UK Albums and Country Chart, the album didn't please UK critics as much as the Long Ryders' debut album Native Sons. Many reviews in the British press were negative, as documented on the live recording "Encore from Hell" where singer Sid Griffin reads out reviews of State of Our Union at a gig in London in December 1985. "There are 10 things wrong with this album," begins the Oxford Mail, "and they’re all the songs." The Northern Echo wrote, "If these guys are at the helm of West Coast rock, abandon ship." One reviewer settled for "three-chord horseshit".

Retrospective reviews were generally positive. Jack Leaver, writing for AllMusic, rated the album 4 stars out of 5, saying that the band's previous release "had already made it clear that the Long Ryders knew how to make great rock & roll, but State of Our Union suggested they had a lot else on their minds". He felt that the album's production gave the songs "a poppier sheen that still allowed the band's roots-conscious sound to shine through." Leaver noted that "Lyrically, State of Our Union took a long look at Reagan-era America as the gulf between the rich and the poor began to divide the nation ... exploring issues of economic injustice, and even the less obvious political songs often having a progressive subtext."

Giving it 10 out of 10, Americana UK called the album "one of the finest ever releases in the genre that didn’t yet know it was called Americana", and added that it "sounds as fine today as it did in 1985".

Music and culture fanzine God Is In The TV, called it "the band's strongest overall album".
 Trouser Press'' was less favorable in their assessment of the album, calling it "a big disappointment" and "an occasionally corny collection of weak melodies, inane lyrics and misguided arrangements."

Track listing
Adapted from the album's liner notes.

2018 expanded edition 
The first disc of the expanded edition contains the fifteen tracks from the 1990 CD version.

Tracks 1–11 recorded July 1985 by Rick Novak at Control Center, Los Angeles, California; track 12 recorded June 1985 by Larry Stutzman at Larry's Pro Sound, Burbank, California.

Recorded live at the Mean Fiddler, Harlesden, London, on the Ronnie Lane Mobile, 8 December 1985; all tracks are previously unreleased, except for "Baby, We All Gotta Go Down" and "Encore from Hell".

Personnel
Adapted from the album's liner notes.
The Long Ryders
Sid Griffin – vocals, guitar, harmonica, autoharp
Stephen McCarthy – vocals, guitar, banjo, lap steel guitar
Tom Stevens – vocals, electric and acoustic bass
Greg Sowders – drums, percussion, keyboards
Additional musicians
Snake Davis and his Longhorns – saxophone on "WDIA"
Vic Collins – pedal steel guitar on "WDIA"
Alan Dunn – accordion on "Child Bride"
Steve Wickham – violin on "If I Were a Bramble and You Were a Rose"
Christine Collister – vocals on "If I Were a Bramble and You Were a Rose"
Technical
Will Birch – producer
Neill King – engineer
Mike Prior – front cover photography
Dorothea Lange – back cover photography
Andy Pearce – remastering (2018 reissue)
Matt Wortham – remastering (2018 reissue)
Tom Stevens – compilation, liner notes (2018 reissue)
Stephen Hammonds – product manager (2018 reissue)
Philip Lloyd-Smee – design (2018 reissue)

Chart positions

References

1985 albums
The Long Ryders albums